Cortinarius carneipallidus is a fungus native to New Zealand. It was described in 2015 by Emma Harrower and Egon Horak, and is related to the northern hemisphere species Cortinarius violaceus.

See also
List of Cortinarius species

References

External links

carneipallidus
Fungi described in 2015
Fungi of New Zealand
Taxa named by Egon Horak